The following is a list of notable text editors.

Graphical and text user interface 
The following editors can either be used with a graphical user interface or a text user interface.

Graphical user interface

Text user interface

System default

Others

vi clones

Sources:

No user interface (editor libraries/toolkits)

ASCII and ANSI art 
Editors that are specifically designed for the creation of ASCII and ANSI text art.
 ACiDDraw – designed for editing ASCII text art. Supports ANSI color (ANSI X3.64)
 JavE – ASCII editor, portable to any platform running a Java GUI
 PabloDraw – ANSI/ASCII editor allowing multiple users to edit via TCP/IP network connections
 TheDraw – ANSI/ASCII text editor for DOS and PCBoard file format support

ASCII font editors 
 FIGlet – for creating ASCII art text
 TheDraw – MS-DOS ANSI/ASCII text editor with built-in editor and manager of ASCII fonts
 PabloDraw – .NET text editor designed for creating ANSI and ASCII art

Historical

Visual and full-screen editors

Line editors

See also 
 Comparison of text editors
 Editor war
 Line editor
 List of HTML editors
 List of word processors
 Outliner, a specialized type of word processor
 Source code editor

Notes 

Text editors